The Insurgents bodies incident is an incident involving American soldiers and Afghan policemen who posed with body parts of dead insurgents during the War in Afghanistan.

Los Angeles Times report
On April 18, 2012 the Los Angeles Times released photos of U.S. soldiers from the 82nd Airborne Division posing with body parts of dead insurgents, after a soldier in the 4th Brigade Combat Team, 82nd Airborne Division gave the photos to the LA Times to draw attention to "a breakdown in security, discipline and professionalism" among U.S. troops operating in Afghanistan.

The incident involved a paratrooper platoon from the 82nd Airborne Division which was charged with two missions which involved the inspecting and identifying of the remains of insurgent suicide bombers. The first mission occurred in Afghanistan's Zabol province in February 2010. The platoon went to a police station in the provincial capital of Qalat where the Afghan police kept the mangled remains of a person whose legs were severed. The paratroopers were told by the police that the severed legs belonged to a suicide bomber whose explosives detonated as he tried to attack a police unit. Posing with members of the Afghan police some paratroopers held the corpse's severed legs.  The second mission led the platoon to the morgue in Qalat in late April or early May 2010 according to the Los Angeles Times. Here the paratroopers should identify three insurgents whose explosives had detonated accidentally as they were preparing a roadside bomb according to Afghan police. The soldiers obtained a few fingerprints and then posed grinning and mugging for photographs next to the remains. The Los Angeles Times reports: "Two soldiers posed holding a dead man's hand with the middle finger raised. A soldier leaned over the bearded corpse while clutching the man's hand. Someone placed an unofficial platoon patch reading "Zombie Hunter" next to other remains and took a picture."

Reactions

American
The Los Angeles Times showed copies of the whole 18 photos to the U.S. Army which launched an investigation into the incident. Army spokesman George Wright said that posing with corpses for photographs outside of officially sanctioned purposes  is a violation of Army standards. "Such actions fall short of what we expect of our uniformed service members in deployed areas." according to Wright, who also said that after the end of the investigation the Army would "take appropriate action" against the involved persons. U.S. Army spokeswoman LTC Margaret Kageleiry told the L.A. Times that most of the soldiers which are seen on the photos have been identified.

U.S. Secretary of Defense Leon E. Panetta called the soldiers behaviour unacceptable, promised a full investigation and said about the soldiers behaviour in comparison to the U.S. armed forces in general: "This is not who we are, and it's certainly not what we represent when it comes to the great majority of men and women in uniform." The actions of the soldiers were condemned by General John Allen, commander of the International Security Assistance Force in Afghanistan (ISAF). US Ambassador to Afghanistan Ryan Crocker said: "The actions were morally repugnant, dishonor the sacrifices of hundreds of thousands of U.S. soldiers and civilians who have served with distinction in Afghanistan, and do not represent the core values of the United States or our military." The New York Times reported that according to White House sources President Obama called for an investigation of the matter and said that those responsible would be held accountable.

Afghan
Taliban spokesman Zabiullah Mujahid called the pictures disrespectful, and condemned both the U.S. soldiers involved in the pictures as well as the Afghan police also featured in them. "We strongly condemn these occupiers and their puppets who are without culture, who are brutal and inhumane," Mujahid said. "Next to these occupiers there are some Afghans—puppets—who were ordered to stand next to the bodies of the martyrs." Afghan President Hamid Karzai said that it is "a disgusting act to take photos with body parts and then share it with others".

As of 19 April 2012, there has been no news of mass protests by the Afghan people such as after the Quran burnings in February 2012, which Afghan lawmakers ascribe to the Afghan people's lack of sympathy for suicide bombers. Mohammad Naim Lalai Hamidzai, a parliamentarian from southern Kandahar, told the Associated Press that "the people of Afghanistan remember the killing of innocent people by suicide bombers and people do not have a good image of these suicide bombers. The burning of Qurans and the killing of children create emotions in people, but there is no sympathy for suicide bombers who kill innocent people." Another reason for the muted reaction in Afghanistan was that evening TV bulletins did not show the photos, and that many ordinary Afghans have no internet access.

References

2012 in Afghanistan
War in Afghanistan (2001–2021)
United States military scandals
Afghanistan–United States relations